Rostanga phepha, is a species of sea slug, a dorid nudibranch, a marine gastropod mollusc in the family Discodorididae.

Distribution
This species has so far only been found around the southern African coast, from the Atlantic side of the Cape Peninsula.Gosliner T.M. 1987. Nudibranchs of Southern Africa  This nudibranch appears to be endemic to South Africa.

Description
Distinctively different to other Rostanga'' species, this animal has a white notum with elongate, scattered, purple-brown spots.

Ecology

References

External links 
 Rudman, W.B., 2002 (February 15) Rostanga phepha Garovoy, Valdés & Gosliner, 2001. [In] Sea Slug Forum. Australian Museum, Sydney. Available from http://www.seaslugforum.net/factsheet/rostphep

Discodorididae
Gastropods described in 2001